Farakhpur is a census town in Yamunanagar district  in the state of Haryana, India.

Demographics
 India census, Farakhpur had a population of 8738. Males constitute 54% of the population and females 46%. Farakhpur has an average literacy rate of 74%, higher than the national average of 59.5%: male literacy is 79%, and female literacy is 67%. In Farakhpur, 13% of the population is under 6 years of age.

References 

Cities and towns in Yamunanagar district